Lytham St Annes Hockey Club is based at Lytham Cricket and Sports Club on Church Rd, Lytham, Lancashire, England.  It comprises 4 men's and 3 ladies' sides with the men's 1st XI competing in the North Hockey League Division 2 West and the ladies' 1st XI competing in North Women's Hockey League Division 2 (West).  All teams play their home games at local school astroturf pitches at AKS Lytham and at Lytham St. Annes High Technology College.

External links
Lytham St Annes Hockey Club website

English field hockey clubs
Sport in the Borough of Fylde
Lytham St Annes